Asura obscurodiscalis is a moth of the family Erebidae. It is found on Goodenough Island.

References

obscurodiscalis
Moths described in 1936
Moths of New Guinea